The Medal of Merit of the Civil Guard is a decoration of Belgium. It was established on 18 November 1830 and was awarded to members of the Belgian Civil Guard for distinguished service.

Insignia 

The medal is circular and is gold plated. the obverse bears a climbing lion holding up a lance surmounted by a phrenic cap, symbolizing liberty and freedom. Below the lion, the name of the creator of the medal is written (Braemt F.).
The reverse of the medal shows a wreath similar to the one surrounding the Maltese cross of the Order of Leopold, being a wreath of laurel (left) and oak leaves (right). Within, the French text "recompense civique" (civil reward) is written.

Ribbon 

The ribbon is 35 mm wide and consists of the following stripes:
 5,6 mm Red;
 1,6 mm Dark green;
 5,6 mm White;
 1,6 mm Dark green;
 11,3 mm Red;
 1,6 mm Dark green;
 5,6 mm White;
 1,6 mm Dark green;
 5,6 mm Red;

Award conditions
The medal was awarded by the Belgian provisional government to members of the Belgian Civil Guard for distinguished service.
Only five medals were ever awarded.

Order of precedence

The order of precedence of the medal was never formally established.

Recipients

 Baron Emmanuel van der Linden d'Hooghvorst
 Colonel Knight Van Coeckelberghe de Dudzele
 Major François Michiels
 An unknown sergeant
 An unknown member of the guard

See also

 List of Orders, Decorations and Medals of the Kingdom of Belgium
 Belgian order of precedence (decorations and medals)

References

 The Medal of Merit of the Civil Guard - Belgian Medals & Awards Pre-WW1
 Le Coin des Médailles

Military awards and decorations of Belgium
Military of Belgium
Awards established in 1830